The New Group was a group of young South African artists who, starting in 1937, began to question and oppose the conservatism of the South African Society of Artists. Its founding chairperson was Gregoire Boonzaier; other founding members were Lippy Lipshitz, Frieda Lock, Cecil Higgs and Terence McCaw.

New Group were contemporary South African artists who worked and exhibited together, included Judith Gluckman and Alexis Preller as well as Lippy Lipschitz, Gregoire Boonzaier (co-founder and president for 10 years), Louis Maurice, Solly Disner and Walter Battiss.

References 

South African artists